The Caterpillar D5 is a small track-type bulldozer manufactured by Caterpillar Inc. The original D5 series was only produced in 1939.  The current D5 series being produced is the D5K.

Versions 
 D5 (9M) was originally built in 1939, with only 46 built. It was a cross between the D4 chassis and the 6-cylinder D6  D4600 engine.
 D5 - reintroduced in 1967.
 D5B - 1977
 D5 SA - Special Application agricultural tractor
 D5H an elevated sprocket model introduced in 1985.
 D5H LGP - Low ground pressure version with wide & long tracks, for soft ground
 D5K - current version
 D5C 1992-2002 non elevated sprocket
 D5E 1993-1999
 d5G hydrostatic drive 2001-
 D5H larger version D5 elevated sprocket 1986-1996
 D5M larger versionD5 elevated "high" sprocket 1996-2003
 D5N larger version elevated sprocket 2003-
 D5 (no letter designation)  current as of 2021

Over the years, Caterpillar often built different series of D5s at the same time, often with a lighter version having more in common with the smaller D3 and D4 tractors, and a larger version more akin to the much larger D6. Usually, the differentiation had to do with whether or not the machine incorporated an elevated or high sprocket drive. And later, this also determined the type of transmission used, with the smaller series using a hydrostatic drive and the larger version typically having a Power-Shift transmission. These varying series have created some confusion with lineage, as the letter designation does not always correspond to when the model of machine was introduced. For example, the D5H came out years before the D5C. Caterpillar has now turned to a straight number designation (no letters) for all of its new track-laying tractors - starting, for the first time, with the D-1 and going all the way up to the D-11, with consistent size and weight breaks between each model. This is a considerable increase over any previous D5 models. Consequently the all-new D5 is much larger than any of the earlier versions.

D5K Specifications

Engine
Gross Power: 74.5 kW (100 hp)
Net Power: 71.6 kW (96 hp)
Bore: 
 Weight: , approx.

Weights
XL Operating weight: 9408 kg (20,741 lb)
LGP Operating weight: 9683 kg (21,347 lb)

See also
 Heavy equipment
 Caterpillar D6
 Caterpillar D4
 List of Caterpillar Inc. machines

References

D05
D05
Bulldozers